Henri Peiffer (born 26 September 1995; Brussels), known professionally as Henri PFR, is a Belgian DJ, musician and composer.

Early life and career 
From the age of six, he spent nine years training in classical piano and studying musical theory. It was around the age of fourteen that young Peiffer first became interested in electronic music. He posted his first mixtape Summer Memories online on the "La Belle Musique" YouTube channel which, with more than 70 million views, caught the attention of Armin van Buuren's Armada label, with which he signed his first two singles, including "Tarida".

He has collaborated with German producer Robin Schulz, for whom he remixed the track "Sugar". Together they produced "Wave Goodbye", a song which is featured on Robin Schulz's album Sugar, released in 2015. Peiffer's music was later released on Sony Music, featuring "One People", "Home" and in October 2016, "Until the End", which remained at the top of the Belgian charts for several months and went platinum in Belgium.

In January 2017, he received the Pure (Belgian radio) Newcomer Award at the D6bels Music Awards. In September 2017, he was honoured by the Walloon Brabant province during the Orchid Ceremony, winning an "Orchid" in the Culture category for having contributed to the profile of the province of Walloon Brabant. In October 2017, he received the International Newcomer of the Year Award at the Fun Radio DJ Awards during the Amsterdam Dance Event.

Discography

Charted singles

References

External links 

 

Musicians from Brussels
Belgian DJs
Belgian electronic musicians
Deep house musicians
Tropical house musicians
1995 births
Living people
Electronic dance music DJs